Takdarkhat is a village in Gudarzi Rural District, Oshtorinan District, Borujerd County, Lorestan Province, Iran. At the 2006 census, its population was 22, in 7 families.

References 

Towns and villages in Borujerd County